Chris Yates (born in Sydney, New South Wales) is an Australian former rugby league footballer for the Western Suburbs Magpies in the National Rugby League.

References

Australian rugby league players
Western Suburbs Magpies players
Living people
Year of birth missing (living people)
Rugby league players from Sydney